Tony Roche and Françoise Dürr were the defending champions, but Roche did not compete. Dürr partnered with Marty Riessen but lost in the third round to Bob Hewitt and Greer Stevens.

Hewitt and Stevens defeated Frew McMillan and Betty Stöve in the final, 3–6, 7–5, 6–4 to win the mixed doubles tennis title at the 1977 Wimbledon Championships.

Seeds

  Frew McMillan /  Betty Stöve (final)
  Phil Dent /  Billie Jean King (semifinals)
  Marty Riessen /  Françoise Dürr (third round)
  Dennis Ralston /  Martina Navratilova (semifinals)

Draw

Finals

Top half

Section 1

Section 2

Section 3

Section 4

References

External links

1977 Wimbledon Championships – Doubles draws and results at the International Tennis Federation

X=Mixed Doubles
Wimbledon Championship by year – Mixed doubles